Events from the year 2012 in the European Union.

Incumbents
President of the European Council – Herman Van Rompuy
Commission President – José Manuel Barroso
Council Presidency – Denmark (January–June) and Cyprus (July–December)
Parliament President – Martin Schulz
High Representative – Catherine Ashton

Events

January
 1 January – Denmark takes over the Presidency of the Council of the European Union from Poland.

March
 2 March – The Treaty on Stability, Coordination and Governance in the Economic and Monetary Union signed.

July
 1 July – Cyprus takes over the Presidency of the Council of the European Union from Denmark.

October
 The Liikanen report, "Report of the European Commission's High-level Expert Group on Bank Structural Reform", published.

December
 5 December – The antitrust regulators of European Commission fined Philips, LG Electronics, Samsung SDI, Panasonic, Toshiba and Technicolor for price fixing of TV cathode-ray tubes in two cartels.

References

 
Years of the 21st century in the European Union
2010s in the European Union